The following highways are numbered 753:

Canada
 Saskatchewan Highway 753

Costa Rica
 National Route 753

United States